Zhytkavichy is a town in Gomel Region, Belarus, and the administrative center of Zhytkavichy District. The population is near 16,600.

History 
Zhytkavichy was first mentioned in 1500.

External links 
Zhytkavichy web-site
Photos on Radzima.org

Towns in Belarus
Populated places in Gomel Region
Zhytkavichy District
Minsk Voivodeship
Mozyrsky Uyezd